Richard Rahul Verma (born November 27, 1968) is an Indian-American lawyer, diplomat, and executive, who served as the U.S. Ambassador to India from 2014 to 2017. Verma previously served as the Assistant Secretary of State for Legislative Affairs from 2009 to 2011. He is currently the Chief Legal Officer and Head of Global Public Policy at Mastercard, a position he has held since October 2020. In December 2022, President Joe Biden announced his intent to nominate him for the role of Deputy Secretary of State for Management and Resources.

After leaving government, Verma served as vice chair of the Asia Group from 2017 to 2020, where he oversaw the firm's South Asia practice. He also practiced law for many years at Steptoe & Johnson LLP in Washington DC.

Early life and education
Verma's parents were born in India and lived through the Partition of India. They first immigrated to the United States in the early 1960s. Verma's father was an English professor at the University of Pittsburgh at Johnstown for forty years. His late mother was a special education teacher.

The youngest of five children, Verma grew up in Johnstown, Pennsylvania, and attended public school in the Westmont Hilltop School District. Verma holds degrees from Georgetown University (Ph.D.), Georgetown University Law Center (LLM), American University Washington College of Law (JD), and Lehigh University (BS, Industrial Engineering). At Lehigh, Verma was in ROTC, a member of Lambda Chi Alpha, and his senior class president.

Early career

Verma began his career in the United States Air Force as an Air Force judge advocate, serving on active duty from 1994 to 1998. His military decorations include the Meritorious Service Medal and the Air Force Commendation Medal.

Verma later served as the senior national security advisor to Senate Majority Leader Harry Reid from 2002 to 2007. In 2008, he was a member of the Commission on the Prevention of WMD proliferation and terrorism, and co-authored World at Risk (2008).

After the inauguration of President Barack Obama, he joined the State Department in 2009 as Assistant Secretary of State for Legislative Affairs under Secretary Hillary Clinton, replacing Matthew A. Reynolds.

U.S. ambassador to India 
In September 2014, President Obama nominated Verma as the next U.S. ambassador to India. On December 4, 2014, the United States Senate Committee on Foreign Relations voted to forward Verma's nomination to the full Senate. On December 9, 2014, Verma was unanimously confirmed by the U.S. Senate

Verma was the first person of Indian descent to hold the position. As ambassador to India, Verma is credited with the historic deepening and expansion of U.S.-India bilateral ties. Verma oversaw one of the largest U.S. diplomatic missions in the world, including four consulates with staff from nearly every agency in the U.S. Government. During his tenure, he championed historic progress in India–United States relations. He oversaw several meetings between President Obama and Prime Minister Narendra Modi, and created over 100 new initiatives and more than 40 government-to-government dialogues. He was also the first U.S. ambassador to travel to every Indian state.

Post-ambassador career 
Verma stepped down from his post as ambassador on January 20, 2017 following the inauguration of President Donald Trump.

Verma went on to serve as Chief Legal Officer at Mastercard. Verma is also an active thought leader and commentator on international relations, international law, trade, and diplomacy. He is a senior fellow the Belfer Center for Science and International Affairs, and serves on the boards of T. Rowe Price and the National Endowment for Democracy. He is a trustee of Lehigh University, where he gave the 151st commencement address in May 2019. He was a centennial fellow at the Walsh School of Foreign Service and co-chaired the Center for American Progress U.S.-India Task Force.

In May 2022, Verma was appointed to serve as a member of the President's Intelligence Advisory Board.

In December 2022, President Joe Biden announced his intent to nominate Verma for the role of Deputy Secretary of State for Management and Resources. His nomination was praised by the Indian American Impact Fund.

Personal life 
Verma is married and has three children.

He is the recipient of numerous awards and honors, including the State Department's Distinguished Service Medal, the Council on Foreign Relations International Affairs Fellowship, and the Chief Justice John Marshall Lifetime Service Award. He was named by India Abroad magazine as one of the fifty most influential Indian-Americans in the country.

References

External links

|-

1968 births
Ambassadors of the United States to India
American politicians of Indian descent
Georgetown University Law Center alumni
Lehigh University alumni
Living people
United States Assistant Secretaries of State
Washington College of Law alumni